Bjørnøya is a village and a populated island in the municipality of Larvik, in the county of Vestfold og Telemark. 

It is the largest island in lake Farris and the only village on the island.

The village of Bjørnøy is located to the west of Nes, Larvik. The two villages are separated by Nesfjord, Norway.

The island's highest peak, in the center of the island, rises to the altitude of 149 meters. A few other peaks on the island have a height of over 100 meters.

Larvik

Islands of Vestfold og Telemark